Thomas Hanasand Drange (born 22 February 1986) is a former Norwegian handball player.

He started his club career in Stavanger.

He made his debut on the Norwegian national team in 2006.

The handball clubs Drange have been member in:

Dunkerque HBGL

FCK Håndbold

Fyllingen

Viking Stavanger HK

References
"Landslagsprofiler – Thomas H. Drange" – Norwegian Handball Association (Retrieved on 4 August 2008)

1986 births
Living people
Norwegian male handball players
Sportspeople from Stavanger